Lophophelma iterans is a moth of the family Geometridae first described by Louis Beethoven Prout in 1926. It is found in China (Guangxi, Shanghai, Zhejiang, Henan, Fujian, Sichuan, Hubei, Gansu, Hunan, Jiangxi, Hainan, Shaanxi) and Taiwan.

The wingspan is 50–65 mm.

Subspecies
Lophophelma iterans iterans (China: Hubei, Hunan, Gansu, Guangxi, Shanghai, Zhejiang, Fujian, Henan, Hainan, Jiangxi, Sichuan, Shaanxi)
Lophophelma iterans onerosus (Inoue, 1970) (Taiwan)

References

External links
 
 

Pseudoterpnini
Moths described in 1926
Taxa named by Louis Beethoven Prout